Toxitiades is a genus of beetles in the family Cerambycidae, containing the following species:

 Toxitiades russus (Fairmaire, 1893)
 Toxitiades sericeus (Guérin-Méneville, 1844)
 Toxitiades subustus (Fairmaire, 1893)
 Toxitiades vinosus (Fairmaire, 1893)

References

Dorcasominae